Culiseta minnesotae is a species of mosquito in the family Culicidae.

References

Culicinae
Articles created by Qbugbot
Insects described in 1957